CRC Oil Storage Depot was one of five oil terminals in Hong Kong and owned by China Resources Petroleum Company Limited (CRC).

See also
 Energy in Hong Kong

External links
 Texaco Oil Depot [1936-1988]. Contains a list of former oil depots in Hong Kong.

Tsing Yi
Oil terminals
Energy infrastructure in Hong Kong